EastLink TV is the brand for EastLink's community channels that serve Northern Ontario, New Brunswick, Newfoundland and Labrador, Nova Scotia and Prince Edward Island. As of 2009, the company's systems in Western Canada are served by the distinct PersonaTV division.

The channels are best known for providing weekly broadcasts of the Quebec Major Junior Hockey League.

Production 

EastLink TV shows are produced by crews composed of both television professionals and community volunteers. Some programs, such as live sports events or EastLink Magazine, will generally have more volunteers on crew than EastLink TV employees.

Providing training and opportunities for volunteers is both a duty under the terms of EastLink's cable license, and an opportunity to produce a wider range of programming than would be possible otherwise.

EastLink TV stations

Nova Scotia 
 Amherst - Channel 10
 Antigonish - Channel 10
 Avonport/Windsor - Channel 10
 Bedford/Sackville - Channel 10
 Berwick/Aylesford/Greenwood/Middleton - Channel 5
 Bridgewater/Lunenburg - Channel 10
 Digby - Channel 10
 Halifax/Dartmouth - Channel 10 SD/610 HD
 Liverpool - Channel 10
 Mount Uniacke - Channel 10
 Pictou County - Channel 10
 New Minas/Kentville/Coldbrook/Wolfville - Channel 10
 Oxford/Collingwood/River Philip - Channel 10
 Parrsboro - Channel 10
 Porters Lake - Channel 10
 Pubnico - Channel 10
 River Hebert - Channel 10
 St. Margaret's Bay/Prospect Bay - Channel 10
 Shelburne/Barrington Passage - Channel 10
 Springhill - Channel 10
 Sydney - Channel 10
 Tidnish - Channel 10
 Truro/Bible Hill - Channel 10
 Yarmouth - Channel 10

New Brunswick 
 Port Elgin - Channel 14
Community programs provided from Amherst, Nova Scotia
 Sackville - Channel 10 
Community programs provided from Amherst, Nova Scotia

Prince Edward Island 
 Charlottetown - Channel 10
 Summerside - Channel 10
 Rural areas - Channel 10

Newfoundland and Labrador 
 Bay Roberts - Channel 10 
 Clarenville - Channel 10
 Lewisporte - Channel 10
 Marysvale - Channel 10
 Springdale - Channel 10 
 Stephenville - Channel 10
 Marystown - Channel 10

Ontario 
Elliot Lake
Greater Sudbury - Channel 10 SD/Channel 610 HD
Kapuskasing
Kirkland Lake
Sauble Beach
Saugeen Shores
Temiskaming Shores
Timmins
West Nipissing

In Greater Sudbury, Saugeen Shores and Timmins, the community channels were previously branded as EastLink TV News, a holdover from the branding used by these stations when they were operated by PersonaTV. Then in 2018, the branding of all community channels changed to EastLink Community TV.

Original programs 

EastLink TV produces a variety of original programming. Some is specific to a particular region, and some is shown network-wide.

 Backyard BBQ Battle A BBQ themed show with two backyard friends competing.

Friday Night Hockey - A show that broadcasts QMJHL games on the network.  All games are produced by EastLink TV.

Sportsland - A weekly hour-long talk show devoted to the world of sports.

Eastlink Magazine - A weekly compilation of good news stories from around Nova Scotia.

Welcome to my Kitchen - Local cookery show

Fishing with Friends - Local fishing show

the path of yoga - Local yoga show

Island View - Local half hour interview, call-in show. (Prince Edward Island)

Avalon East Senior Hockey League  - Local coverage of the EastLink CeeBee Stars Hockey Team. (Newfoundland)

External links
 EastLink TV
 EastLink News

Canadian community channels
Analog cable television networks in Canada
Television channels and stations established in 1970
1970 establishments in Canada